Nikolai Pavlovich Miloslavsky (1811–1882) was a Russian actor.

He first joined the army serving in the cavalry. However he soon abandoned his military career and in 1839 appeared on stage in Saint Petersburg in the vaudeville Thirty years or the life of a gambler, which he had translated from French, without drawing attention. He then played in Moscow, Odessa, Nizhny Novgorod and other cities. In 1850 in Kaluga, he directed Aleksandr Griboyedov's play "Woe from Wit", which was blacklisted in many Russian provincial cities. He returned to Saint Petersburg in 1859 where, this time, his performance was a great success. However he was not able to secure a place in the Alexandrinsky Theatre or the Maly Theatre, Saint Petersburg's main theatres, which, at the time, were dominated by Vasily Samoilov. In 1870 he moved to Odessa, where he created his own theatre company and from 1874 his company was mainly playing at the Odessa Russian Theatre.

Nikolai Miloslavsky died in Odessa in 1882.

Theatre roles 

Among the plays in which he acted were:

 Aleksandr Palm's The Old Landowner as Opolyev,
  Aleksandr Sukhovo-Kobylin's play Krechinsky's Wedding as Krechinsky in
 Trente ans, ou la Vie d’un joueur by Victor Ducange, Jacques-Félix Beudin and  Prosper Goubaux as  Georges de Germany
 Nikolai Polevoy's "Ugolino" as  Nino
 Shakespeare's King Lear in the title role, 
 Shakespeare's Hamlet in the title role 
 Shakespeare's The Merchant of Venice as Shylock
 Edward Bulwer-Lytton's Richelieu as Cardinal Richelieu
 Friedrich Schiller's "Intrigue and Love" as Ferdinand
 Aleksey Konstantinovich Tolstoy's "The Death of Ivan the Terrible" »  as  Ivan the Terrible
 Aleksandr Ostrovsky's "The Poor Bride" as Vladimir Vasilyevich Merich
 Aleksandr Ostrovsky's "Enough Stupidity in Every Wise Man" as Ivan Ivanovich Gorodulin  
 Aleksandr Ostrovsky's "A Profitable place" as  Aristarkh Vladimirych Vyshnevsky

References 
 МИЛОСЛАВСКИЙ Николай Карлович
 Милославский Николай Карлович

19th-century male actors from the Russian Empire
Russian male stage actors
1811 births
1882 deaths